The Pharmaceutical Management Agency (Māori: Te Pātaka Whaioranga), better known as Pharmac, is a New Zealand Crown entity that decides, on behalf of Te Whatu Ora – Health New Zealand, which medicines and pharmaceutical products are subsidised for use in the community and public hospitals.

Pharmac was created in 1993 as a response to the ever-increasing costs of pharmaceuticals. The agency's primary aim is "to secure for eligible people in need of pharmaceuticals, the best health outcomes that are reasonably achievable from pharmaceutical treatment and from within the amount of funding provided." In 2016/17, Pharmac had a subsidy budget of approximately $850 million, which was used to subsidise 48.5 million prescriptions issued to 3.6 million New Zealanders.

While initially responsible for community medicines only, Pharmac's role has been expanded to include all medicines used in DHB hospitals, and in preparation for the national management of medical devices. On 1 July 2012, the management of the national immunisation schedule, and assessment of new vaccines, transferred to Pharmac from the Ministry of Health.

Pharmac's current governing legislation is the New Zealand Public Health and Disability Act 2000, specifically sections 46 to 53. As a Crown entity, the agency is responsible to the Minister of Health via its board of directors.

Roles
Pharmac has four main roles:
 Managing the New Zealand Pharmaceutical Schedule of about 2,000 Government-subsidised community pharmaceuticals
 Promoting the best possible (or optimal) use of medicines
 Managing the subsidy of medicines and some medical devices used in public hospitals
 Managing the Named Patient Pharmaceutical Assessment (NPPA) policy (a mechanism for people to receive funded medicines not available through the Pharmaceutical Schedule) and other special access programmes.

One of the main techniques Pharmac uses to reduce costs is only subsidising one brand of a medication at a time. Where a medicine is off-patent and generic versions are available, Pharmac typically tenders out the right to be the sole subsidised brand for a fixed period of time (usually three years). This causes pharmaceutical companies to compete with each other, driving down prices and reducing the subsidy costs, freeing up funds to subsidise newer patented medicines.

Performance and political status
Pharmac has been hailed for its success in controlling New Zealand's expenditure on pharmaceuticals. A British Medical Journal article from 2010 cites Pharmac as the key reason for New Zealand’s low pharmaceutical prices.

Pharmac has been a regular point of contention in debates around potential free-trade agreements which could affect its ability to operate, particularly the Trans-Pacific Partnership Agreement (TPPA).

New Zealand's Pharmaceutical market and Pharmac were noted to feature heavily in diplomatic cables released by WikiLeaks in 2010.

Opponents of the TPPA say US corporations are hoping to weaken Pharmac's ability to get inexpensive, generic medicines by forcing New Zealand to pay for brand name drugs. Doctors and organisations like Médecins Sans Frontières have also expressed concern. The New Zealand Government denies the claims; Trade Negotiations Minister Tim Groser saying opponents of the deal are "fools" who are "trying to "wreck this agreement".

In early March 2021, Prime Minister Jacinda Ardern and Health Minister Andrew Little announced that the Government would be appointing a panel of experts to review Pharmac's timeliness and transparency of decision-making.

References

External links
 Pharmaceutical Management Agency website

New Zealand Crown agents
Medical and health organisations based in New Zealand
Pharmacy organizations
Pharmaceuticals policy
1993 establishments in New Zealand